Pay Attention is the sixth studio album by The Mighty Mighty Bosstones. It was released on May 2, 2000 by Island Records. The video for "So Sad to Say" premiered on MTV's 120 Minutes on April 25, 2000. In March and April 2001, the band held several shows in certain US cities as part of a multi-day club tour.

It reached #74 on the Billboard 200.

Track listing
All songs written by Dicky Barrett and Joe Gittleman, except where noted.
"Let Me Be" – 3:52
"The Skeleton Song" – 3:01
"All Things Considered" (Barrett, Nate Albert) – 4:01
"So Sad to Say" – 3:10
"Allow Them" – 3:57
"High School Dance" – 2:52
"Over the Eggshells" – 2:59
"She Just Happened" – 2:53
"Finally" – 3:47
"I Know More" – 3:08
"Riot on Broad Street" – 3:13
"One Million Reasons" (Barrett, Gittleman, Dennis Brockenborough) – 3:01
"Bad News and Bad Breaks" – 3:33
"Temporary Trip" – 2:27
"Where You Come From" (Barrett, Albert) – 2:46
"The Day He Didn't Die" (Barrett, Albert) – 3:24

Big Rig 12" Double Vinyl bonus tracks
"The Meaning" – 2:33
"The Skeleton Song (Demo)" – 3:10
"Simmer Down (Live)" – 2:29
"New England Memories" – 2:28

Australia CD bonus tracks
"Together" – 3:05
"Just As Much" – 3:01

Personnel
Dicky Barrett – lead vocals
Nate Albert – guitars, backing vocals
Joe Gittleman – bass, backing vocals
Tim "Johnny Vegas" Burton – saxophone, backing vocals
Roman Fleysher – saxophone
Dennis Brockenborough – trombone
Joe Sirois – drums
Ben Carr – Bosstone, vocals
Paul Q. Kolderie  – producer, engineer
Johnny Goetchius  – keyboards, backing vocals
Rolf Langsjoen – trumpet
John Allen – vocals on track 11
Paul Scarpino – acoustic guitar on track 11
Ernie Wilson – bass guitar on track 11
Bob Richards – drums on track 11
Nat Freedberg – backing vocals on track 9
Mark Higgins – musician
Billy O'Malley – musician
Andrew Schneider – engineer
Sean Slade  – engineer
Fran Flannery – assistant engineer
Ted Paduck – assistant engineer
Andy Wallace  – mixing
Howie Weinberg  – mastering
Steve Sisco – assistant
Joseph Cultice  – photography
Bill Horsman – photography

Notes/Trivia
 This was the last album recorded with guitarist Nate Albert, trombonist Dennis Brockenborough, and the first with Roman Fleysher on saxophone.  It was also the band's last on a major label.
 "So Sad to Say", the first single off this album, made its debut at Fenway Park on the big screen on Opening Day, 2000.
 "Riot on Broad Street" is based on the fights between Yankee firefighters and an Irish funeral procession on June 11, 1837.

References

2000 albums
The Mighty Mighty Bosstones albums
Albums produced by Paul Q. Kolderie